The 2004 Women's British Open was held 29 July to 1 August at Sunningdale Golf Club in Berkshire, England. It was the 28th edition of the Women's British Open, and the fourth as a major championship on the LPGA Tour. TNT Sports, ABC Sports and BBC Sport broadcast the event in the United States and the United Kingdom.

Karen Stupples won her only major, five shots ahead of runner-up Rachel Teske.

Field

Past champions in the field

Round summaries

First round
Thursday, 29 July 2004

Second round
Friday, 30 July 2004

Amateurs: Stahle (−2), McKevitt (+9)

Third round
Saturday, 31 July 2004

Final round
Sunday, 1 August 2004

Amateur: Stahle (+2)
Source:

References

External links
Ladies European Tour: 2004 Weetabix Women's British Open results
LPGA: 2004 Women's British Open results

Women's British Open
Golf tournaments in England
British Open
Women's British Open
July 2004 sports events in the United Kingdom
Women's British Open
2000s in Berkshire